Ryan Patrick Kelly (born May 30, 1993) is an American football center for the Indianapolis Colts of the National Football League (NFL).  He played college football at Alabama, and was drafted by the Colts in first round (18th overall) of the 2016 NFL Draft.

Early years
Kelly attended Lakota West High School in West Chester, Ohio, where he was teammates with Jordan Hicks. As a junior in 2009, he was a first team all-conference and all-city selection on the offensive line. During his senior season, he suffered a torn anterior cruciate ligament (ACL) in the last game of his season against rival Lakota East, yet he still was named third-team Division I All-Ohio. Although selected, he was unable to play at the Under Armour All-America Game coming off of his knee injury.

Rated as a three-star recruit by ESPN, Kelly was ranked as the No. 4 center prospect in his class. He collected numerous scholarship offers from major programs, including Alabama, Florida, Florida State, Michigan, and Tennessee, but none from his home-state Ohio State Buckeyes who signed the third-ranked center, Brian Bobek from Palatine, Illinois, instead. Kelly verbally committed to Alabama in July 2010.

College career
After redshirting his initial year in Tuscaloosa, Kelly came off the bench to play in 10 games of the 2012 season at center, backing up All-American senior Barrett Jones. Kelly was named to the SEC All-Freshman team, alongside Amari Cooper and T. J. Yeldon. In his sophomore year, Kelly took over starting duties from Jones, making the calls on an offensive line that ranked 23rd nationally and fourth in the SEC for fewest sacks allowed per game (1.31).

As a junior, Kelly was named to the Rimington Trophy watch list and started 12 games at center. A highly reliable anchor on the offensive line, he missed just seven assignments in 806 snaps on the year for a 99.1 percent success rate and did not allow a quarterback sack. After wins at Tennessee and against Western Carolina he was named Alabama's Offensive Player of the Week. In his senior season, Kelly missed only eight assignments in 1,012 snaps for a success rate of 99.2 percent on the season, and committed just one penalty in 1,012 snaps with no holding calls. He was a consensus first team All-America selection, earning first-team honors from Walter Camp, USA Today, Sporting News, the FWAA, and the AFCA, and won the Rimington Trophy in 2015.

Professional career

The Indianapolis Colts selected Kelly in the first round (18th overall) of the 2016 NFL Draft. The Colts drafted him with the expectation of him becoming “the first solid center for the franchise since Jeff Saturday.” He was Alabama's first interior offensive lineman selected in the first round since Chance Warmack in 2013.

On May 4, 2016, the Indianapolis Colts signed Kelly to a fully guaranteed four-year, $10.45 million contract that includes a signing bonus of $5.80. He started all 16 games at center during his rookie year.

On August 17, 2017, it was revealed that Kelly would undergo foot surgery for a broken bone he suffered during practice. He missed the first four weeks of the season, and went on to start the next seven games. He suffered a concussion in Week 12 and missed the next three games before being placed on injured reserve on December 18, 2017.

On April 27, 2019, the Colts picked up the fifth-year option on Kelly's contract.

On September 4, 2020, the Colts signed Kelly to a four-year, $50 million extension, making him the highest paid center in the NFL.

NFL career statistics

Personal life 
On December 17, 2021 Kelly and his wife Emma lost their newborn daughter due to a heart failure.

References

External links
Indianapolis Colts bio

1993 births
Living people
People from West Chester, Butler County, Ohio
Sportspeople from the Cincinnati metropolitan area
Players of American football from Ohio
American football centers
Alabama Crimson Tide football players
All-American college football players
Indianapolis Colts players
American Conference Pro Bowl players